Boulenophrys is a genus of frogs in the family Megophryidae. They occur in the China, Mainland Southeast Asia and Northeast India. It had been placed variously as a subgenus or synonymy of Megophrys. Dubois, Ohler and Pyron first recognized that Panophrys is preoccupied and employed Boulenophrys as the generic name rather than Tianophrys under the Principle of First Revisor.

The most of the species in this genus were formerly considered species of the genus Megophrys.

Taxonomy
The following species are recognised in the genus Boulenophrys:

References

 
Megophryidae
Amphibians of Asia
Amphibian genera